Osvaldo Rafael Ozzan (born January 25, 1970 in Buenos Aires) is a former Argentine football winger and striker who played at professional level for San Lorenzo in Argentina, Huachipato and Cobresal in Chile, Oriente Petrolero, Blooming, Guabirá and Unión Central in Bolivia, Deportivo Cúcuta in Colombia and Deportivo Quito in Ecuador.

References

External links
 Osvaldo Ozzan - Argentine Primera statistics at Fútbol XXI  
 Osvaldo Ozzan at BDFA.com.ar 

1970 births
Living people
Footballers from Buenos Aires
Argentine footballers
Association football forwards
San Lorenzo de Almagro footballers
Oriente Petrolero players
Argentine expatriate sportspeople in Ecuador
S.D. Quito footballers
Argentine expatriate sportspeople in Chile
Club Blooming players
Cúcuta Deportivo footballers
Argentine Primera División players
Categoría Primera A players
Argentine expatriate footballers
Expatriate footballers in Chile
Expatriate footballers in Bolivia
Expatriate footballers in Ecuador
Guabirá players
Argentine expatriate sportspeople in Bolivia
Unión Tarija players